"Be Sweet"  is a song by American indie pop band Japanese Breakfast, released on March 2, 2021, as the lead single from their third studio album Jubilee.

Though the band's work previously dealt with lead vocalist's Michelle Zauner's personal struggles with grief, "Be Sweet" saw the band divert from its usual indie rock sound and lean heavily into a pop direction. The song received praise from critics, who lauded its joyful, vibrant sound. The band would release various alternative and cover versions of the song, while also performing it frequently at festivals and on television late night and talk shows.

Background and recording

Japanese Breakfast's first two studio albums Psychopomp (2016) and Soft Sounds from Another Planet (2017) were markedly noted by music critics and listeners as showcasing lead singer Michelle Zauner's personal grief. In the interim years between Soft Sounds and Jubilee, Zauner studied music theory and piano. Craig Hendrix, her bandmate and the album's co-producer, also encouraged her to help compose the album's string and horn arrangements. 

Zauner commented on her efforts on the album's creation, stating "After spending the last five years writing about grief, I wanted our follow up to be about joy," and adding, "For me, a third record should feel bombastic and so I wanted to pull out all the stops for this one." The band leaned into a more pop sound for "Be Sweet"; Zauner stated that Björk and Kate Bush "who are essentially pop musicians with mass appeal — but they're both really fucking weird," helped inspire the band to explore pop.

Zauner co-wrote "Be Sweet" with Jack Tatum of Wild Nothing. Jubilees album notes credit Zauner, Hendrix, and Tatum are credited as producers for the song. Hendrix handled much of the album's drumming and production. Jubilee was recorded in 2019 and slated for release in 2020. The album's release was eventually postponed to 2021, with the delay attributed to the COVID-19 pandemic. The band then tweeted "LP3 coming" in January 2021, teasing the album's release.

"Be Sweet" is the second track on Jubilee; Zauner stated that while "Paprika" was planned to be the album's opening track, only a track like "Be Sweet" could follow it up, stating "that's the sort of sucker punch, this real in-your-face pop number."

Composition
"Be Sweet" leaned away from the band's indie rock sound and into a more pop direction. Zauner admitted she was anxious about how the pop sound of "Be Sweet" would be received, telling Rolling Stone, "I really worried that everyone was going to get mad at me and think I was, like, going full-on pop." She further stated that the song is "obviously [the band's] poppiest" and most "radio-ready", but maintained that "the rest of the songs [on Jubilee] are really wacky and weird." The song features "light synths and shuffling percussion" in its production.

Release
The song was released as Jubilees lead single on March 2, 2021, through Dead Oceans. The record label simultaneously announced the album's release date for June 4 later that year.

Reception
The track has been positively received by music writers, with many noting it featuring a joyful sound hearkening back to the sound of 1980s pop music. In his review of Jubilee, Will Richards of NME praised "Be Sweet", calling it "a superbly catchy, '80s-indebted pop smash" with a "triumphant chorus." Ian Carlos Campbell of The Verge called the song "summer-y and eminently danceable."

Quinn Moreland of Pitchfork wrote that "Be Sweet" is a "touch of pop extravagance à la Kate Bush, one of Zauner's main influences; the extended, windswept indie-guitar-hero moment we've come to expect in the genre, that feels somehow indebted to Nels Cline. Through it all, she emanates an outward electricity and deep interiority." The magazine's Cat Zhang commented that the song is "more buoyant and colorful than most of [Zauner's] previous music." Zhang continued, stating the song "rattles with energy, trading previous influences like shoegaze and Pacific Northwest indie rock for danceable '80s synth-pop."

Live performances

Japanese Breakfast performed "Be Sweet" on The Tonight Show Starring Jimmy Fallon in March, shortly after the single's release. The performance was filmed at the Brooklyn-based venue, National Sawdust. The band also performed "Jimmy Fallon Big!" from Soft Sounds, with Fallon himself explaining the song's background prior to the bonus performance. The performance of "Be Sweet" on The Tonight Show received a Libera Awards nomination for Best Live/Livestream Act.

Coinciding with the album's release in June, the band performed "Be Sweet", as well as "Kokomo, IN" and "Tactics" on CBS This Mornings "Saturday Sessions" segment. The band continued to perform the song on television in 2022; in January, they performed it on The Ellen DeGeneres Show. April saw the band perform the song on The Kelly Clarkson Show. Later that May, as musical guests for the season 47 finale of Saturday Night Live, the band performed "Be Sweet" and "Paprika". Stephen Thompson of NPR ranked Japanese Breakfast 11th of the 21 musical guest performances during the season.

The band also performed the song during their Jubilee Tour, which began on August 7, 2021, and continued through 2022. They performed at the Pitchfork Music Festival in July 2022, with a "Be Sweet Lager" beer made available at the festival. The persimmon-flavored beer was made in collaboration with Goose Island; persimmons served as the main visual motif for Jubilee and featured prominently on the album's cover art. The beer's proceeds benefited Heart of Dinner, an organization that aims to combat food insecurity within New York's elderly Asian American community. 

For their August 6 performance Pentaport Rock Festival in Incheon, South Korea, the band performed a Korean-language cover version of the song with vocals from So!YoON! of Se So Neon. Their October performance at the Hackney Church venue in London was given a lukewarm review by Shaad D'Souza of The Guardian, although D'Souza specified "Be Sweet" as one of the songs to "fare better" during the performance.

Cover and alternate versions
In June 2021, the band released a Simlish cover during the rollout of Cottage Living, an expansion pack for The Sims 4. In October, Japanese Breakfast released Live at Electric Lady, an 8-track live EP. Recorded at Electric Lady Studios, the EP featured a live version of "Be Sweet".

The following March, the band released a "Spotify Singles" version of the song. This version included a "disco beat and call-and-response vocals."

In preparation for the band's live performance in South Korea, a Korean-language cover version was released on July 20, 2022. Zauner received help from Yaeji on the translation over a year prior. So!YoON! of Se So Neon provided the vocals for the cover, with Zauner calling her one of her favorite indie artists in Seoul.

Music videos
"Be Sweet" was released accompanied by a music video starring Zauner and Missy of Mannequin Pussy. Directed by Zauner, the video features the two as X-Files-inspired agents investigating the paranormal.

The Simlish cover version released a music video, featuring Zauner singing to a herd of cows while dressed in gingham and a big sunhat. A music video was also released for the Korean cover. Animated by Mary Vertulfo, it featured a "stylish, neon-lit [visualizer of Zauner and So!YoOn!] driving".

Charts

Notes

References

2021 singles
2021 songs
Alternative pop songs
Dead Oceans singles
Dream pop songs
Indie pop songs
Japanese Breakfast songs
Synth-pop songs
Works postponed due to the COVID-19 pandemic